The 2022–23 Sacred Heart Pioneers men's basketball team represented Sacred Heart University in the 2022–23 NCAA Division I men's basketball season. The Pioneers, led by tenth-year head coach Anthony Latina, played their home games at the William H. Pitt Center in Fairfield, Connecticut as members of the Northeast Conference.

Previous season
The Pioneers finished the 2021–22 season 10–20, 6–12 in NEC play to finish in seventh place. They lost in the quarterfinals of the NEC tournament to LIU.

Roster

Schedule and results

|-
!colspan=12 style=""| Regular season

|-
!colspan=9 style=| NEC Tournament

Sources

References

Sacred Heart Pioneers men's basketball seasons
Sacred Heart
Sacred Heart Pioneers men's basketball
Sacred Heart Pioneers men's basketball